Turbine was the lead ship of her class of eight destroyers built for the  (Royal Italian Navy) during the 1920s. Her name means whirlwind.

Design and description
The Turbine-class destroyers were enlarged and improved versions of the preceding  s. Their complement was 12 officers and 167 enlisted men.

The Turbines were powered by two Parsons geared steam turbines, each driving one propeller shaft using steam supplied by three Thornycroft boilers.

Their main battery consisted of four  guns in two twin-gun turrets, one each fore and aft of the superstructure. Anti-aircraft (AA) defense for the Turbine-class ships was provided by a pair of  AA guns in single mounts amidships and a twin-gun mount for  machine guns. They were equipped with six  torpedo tubes in two triple mounts amidships. The Turbines could carry 52 mines.

Construction and career
Turbine was laid down by Odero-Terni-Orlando at their Genoa-Sestri Ponente shipyard on 24 March 1925, launched on 21 April 1927 and completed on 27 August. In 1934 after another reorganization Turbine as well as Aquilone, Nembo and Euro were again reunited, now forming the 8th Destroyer Squadron, part of II Naval Division. Together with Nembo she was temporarily deployed to the Red Sea to conduct training in tropical climate in 1934.

Spanish Civil War
After the Civil War started in Spain in July 1936, both Italy and Nazi Germany supported the Nationalists of General Franco, whereas Soviet Union was actively supporting the Republicans. During the first year of the war, the Soviets used the Republican controlled ports of Bilbao and Santander in the North of Spain adjacent to the French border, but after their fall in the summer of 1937, the USSR was forced to use ports in the Mediterranean to continue supplying the Republicans. Both Italy and Germany deployed their submarines in the Mediterranean in early 1937 to interdict with Republican shipping, but without much success. On 3 August 1937 Franco made an urgent plea with Mussolini to use the Italian fleet to prevent the passage of a large Soviet transport convoy, which just departed from Odessa. Originally, only submarines were supposed to be used, but Mussolini was convinced by Franco to use Italian surface ships too against the Soviets. At the time Turbine was under command of captain Virgilio Rusca.

On 17 August Turbine and  while on patrol off the African coast sighted Republican steamer  sailing under the British flag. The freighter, however, managed to escape her pursuers by entering French territorial waters, and continuing close to the coast until she reached the port of Algiers.

On 30 August 1937 Turbine was on patrol together with Ostro, when they encountered the Soviet cargo ship  around 16:00. The destroyers continued shadowing the ship until the darkness fell, and around 21:00 Turbine launched two torpedoes at the Soviet vessel, and Ostro launched one. The cargo ship was hit by two torpedoes in quick succession and rapidly sank in the position , approximately 74 miles east of Algiers. Two lifeboats with all 29 survivors were towed to Dellys by local fishing boats, and successfully reached the shore at 01:00 on 31 August. The Soviet steamer was not a blockade runner, and was transporting 2,834 tons of coal from Cardiff to Port Said.

In September 1937 the Nyon Conference was called by France and Great Britain to address the "underwater piracy" conducted against merchant traffic in the Mediterranean. On 14 September an agreement was signed establishing British and French patrol zones around Spain (with a total of 60 destroyers and airforce employed) to counteract aggressive behavior by submarines. Italy was not directly accused, but had to comply with the agreement and suspend the maritime operations.

World War II
At the time of Italy entry into World War II Turbine together with Euro, Nembo and Aquilone formed 1st Destroyer Squadron based in Tobruk. Initially, she was assigned escort and anti-submarine duties.

On 6 June 1940, in preparation for hostilities, the ships of 1st Destroyer Squadron together with the auxiliar cruiser Bartletta laid fourteen minefields (540 mines) around Tobruk.

At 23:21 pm on 13 June 1940, Strale sighted an enemy submarine at the entrance of the Gulf of Taranto, and proceeded to attack her with gunfire and attempted to ram the submarine. Odin managed to get away with some damage, however, she was later that night sunk by Italian destroyer .

After an air reconnaissance revealed large number of ships present in Tobruk harbor, including several destroyers, British command ordered an air attack on Tobruk on 12 June. The air strike was carried out by Blenheims from 45, 55, 113 and 211 Squadrons in the early morning hours of 12 June. British bombers were intercepted by CR.32s from 92nd, 93rd and 94th Squadriglias, forcing some bombers to turn away, or drop their bombs prematurely. Several bombers managed to get through and bombed the harbor between 04:52 and 05:02 causing only negligible damage.

In response the Italian command ordered a bombardment of Sollum. The raid was carried out both by Regia Aeronautica and Regia Marina, with twelve SM.79 bombers dropping bombs in the early morning of 15 June, while destroyers Turbine, Nembo and Aquilone shelled the town from 03:49 to 04:05, firing 220 shells of their main caliber, but dealing negligible damage to the installations due to thick fog present at the time of attack. Another bombardment of Sollum was performed between 05:35 and 06:18 on 26 June by the same destroyer group "with considerable effectiveness" expending 541 shells in the process.

On 19 June 1940 while conducting another anti-submarine mission Turbine, about 25 miles north of Tobruk, detected and attacked with depth charges another British submarine, and sank her in the approximate position .

On 5 July 1940 there were seven s berthed in Tobruk harbor, including Turbine, together with four torpedo boats, six freighters and several auxiliary vessels. Between 10:00 to 11:15 a Short Sunderland reconnaissance plane overflew the harbor at an altitude of 1,500-2,000 meters and despite the anti-aircraft fire opened against it, confirmed the presence of numerous ships in the harbor. In the late afternoon a group of nine Fairey Swordfish torpedo bombers of 813 Naval Air Squadron took off from the airfield in Sidi Barrani and headed towards Tobruk. The air alarm was sounded at 20:06 but the Italians failed to detect the Allied aircraft until they were already over the harbor at 20:20. The attack commenced a few minutes later, and lasted only seven minutes and resulted in five Italian ships being sunk or damaged. Not encountering any aerial opposition, British torpedo bombers attacked from low altitude (around 100 feet), and released their torpedoes from 400–500 meters away, almost point-blank.  was attacked first by a plane piloted by Nicholas Kennedy, whose torpedo hit the destroyer in the bow, around the ammunition depot, between the bridge and a 120 mm cannon. The explosion broke the ship into two and sank it half an hour later. Freighter  was also hit, capsized and sank, while Euro and steamer  were hit, and had to be beached, and the ocean liner  was hit and damaged. Two planes also attacked other destroyers, including Turbine, but failed to launch their torpedoes due to intense anti-aircraft fire. The air alarm was canceled at 21:31, and by that time all nine British planes were far away.

On 19 July 1940 British command, believing that the light cruiser , damaged during the Battle of Cape Spada, had taken refuge in Tobruk, decided to launch a new bomber attack against the base. Turbine was berthed deeper in the harbor, in the port itself, close to the wreck of Euro which was beached after the 5 July raid. Around 17:00 twelve Bristol Blenheim bombers from 55 Squadron and 211 Squadron RAF bombed the northern part of the harbor, slightly damaging an anti-aircraft battery and the port's facilities, and losing one aircraft. At 18:56 a seaplane from the 700 Naval Air Squadron launched by the British battleship  appeared to investigate results of the bombing. The seaplane was immediately targeted by anti-aircraft batteries, and shot down. At 21:54 Tobruk was put on alert again after receiving reports from the Bardia and Sidi Belafarid advanced listening stations. Around 22:30 six Fairey Swordfish torpedo bombers from the 824 Naval Air Squadron RAF appeared in the skies above Tobruk harbor and were met with strong anti-aircraft fire. This forced the planes to make several passes over the area trying to avoid the fire, and also to acquire the targets, the situation exacerbated by a fairly cloudy night. The British finally managed to sort out their objectives by about 01:30 on 20 July and assumed attack formation at low altitude. At 01:32 steamer  was struck in the stern by a torpedo, launched from a plane, piloted by squadron commander F. S. Quarry, causing her to slowly sink. At 01:34 Ostro was hit in her stern ammunition depot by a torpedo launched from another plane, causing the ship to go ablaze and sink ten minutes later. Nembo was hit by a torpedo from a plane piloted by E. S. Ashley at 01:37 and sank. The British lost one plane in the attack which crash-landed on the way back in the Italian controlled territory.

Following this attack the Italian Command considered Tobruk to be too vulnerable to enemy air attacks, and decided to shift deliveries to Benghazi. The cargo was then carried along the coast of Libya by coastal convoys of 1-2 ships, sometimes accompanied by escorts. Turbine along with other destroyers and torpedo boats were relocated to Benghazi as well. During the months of August and early September 1940 the destroyer conducted patrols outside the Benghazi harbor and some coastal escorting missions.

On 13 September 1940 the Italian Army invaded Egypt and captured Sollum. A convoy was sighted travelling east along the Libyan coast on 15 September by a Short Sunderland flying boat from 230 Squadron. In attempt to help their ground force, the Royal Navy designed attacks on Italian bases, in particular, Benghazi.

In the evening of 16 September 1940 Turbine together with destroyers  and Aquilone was berthed in Benghazi harbor. At 19:30 steamers Maria Eugenia and Gloria Stella escorted by  arrived from Tripoli bringing the total number of vessels present in the harbor to 32. The anti-aircraft defenses opened fire but were unable to stop the attack. After passing over the harbor to determine their targets, Swordfish bombers made their first attack at 00:57 hitting and sinking  and severely damaging torpedo boat , harbor tug Salvatore Primo and an auxiliary vessel Giuliana. The bombers then conducted a second assault at 1:00 striking and sinking  and destroyer . While torpedo bombers attacked the harbor, six Swordfish aircraft armed with mines laid them undetected about 75 meters outside the harbor entrance. Neither Turbine nor Aquilone were targeted in this raid probably due to them being further away from the rest of the ships.

Next morning, the Libyan Naval Command (Comando Marilibia) fearing new attacks by the British aircraft decided to empty Benghazi harbor. At 11:38 on 17 September the first cargo ship  departed Benghazi for Tripoli escorted by an old torpedo boat . As soon as the freighter left the harbor she hit a mine, and had to be towed back into port. The area was dredged to clear potential mines, and all ships were ordered to follow the cleared channel out of the harbor.

Turbine and Aquilone also received an order to leave Benghazi and departed from port at 20:15, with Turbine leading. At around 20:45 while about a mile outside the dredged area, Aquilone struck two magnetic mines, one in the middle and one by her stern, forcing the destroyer to immediately start veering to the left, towards the coast. The explosions threw many men overboard, and caused the depth charges to drop into water, but due to shallow depth, 40–45 feet, they did not go off. In the darkness, it was unclear what happened, and the harbor anti-aircraft weapons started firing, while Turbine accelerated and started zigzagging trying to protect herself from non-existent air threat. Turbine was then ordered to leave the area, not approach Aquilone, and proceed to Tripoli on her own. With her rudder stuck, Aquilone was flooded quickly, and sank in about 5 minutes. Despite quick sinking, rough weather and darkness, the ship was abandoned in order limiting the number of casualties, with 4 people killed, 9 missing and 20 wounded. The port of Benghazi was temporarily closed until the arrival from Italy of a minesweeper with electromagnetic sweeping gear to conduct proper demining.

On 8 February 1941 Turbine together with torpedo boats ,  and  departed Naples escorting German vessels ,  and  carrying elements of the German 5th Light Division, part of the Afrika Korps, for Tripoli. The convoy had to stop at Palermo on 9 February to wait out a possible sortie by British Force H, and departed it next day arriving in Tripoli at 15:00 on 11 February 1941. Turbine then returned to Naples on 15 February.

The convoy successfully arrived in Tripoli on 12 March without any incidents.

The convoy arrived in Tripoli on 5 April without any incidents.

The convoy arrived at Tripoli on 24 April without any incidents.

The steamer  was hit by two torpedoes and sank, while  was struck by another torpedo and seriously damaged.  had to turn around and head back to Tripoli, escorted by Turbine.  was counter-attacked by the destroyers, forcing the submarine to dive and withdraw for about three hours but caused her no damage.  was observed again by the submarine at 14:45 sailing slowly towards Tripoli with Turbine standing by.  dove for another attack at 17:30 and launched another attack against  at 19:01 with two torpedoes. Both torpedoes struck the freighter causing her to sink about 45 minutes later in approximate position , about  miles east of Kerkennah. The whole crew was saved by Turbine without loss. The rest of the convoy sailed into Trapani to wait out any further attacks.

The convoy proceeded to Palermo where tanker  joined in. At 11:30 on 19 May the convoy was attacked in the Sicilian Strait by British submarine  forcing ships to take evasive action. As a result, steamer  and tanker  collided, but were able to continue on to Tripoli. On 20 May  attempted another attack, targeting steamer  and tanker  in the position  but the attack proved to be unsuccessful. The convoy arrived at Tripoli on 21 May 1941.

The convoy had to return to Tripoli and departed again on 26 May reaching Naples and Palermo safely on 31 May.

The convoy successfully reached Tripoli on 2 July.

After safely arriving in Libya and unloading the same convoy departed Tripoli on 29 July 1941, safely arriving in Italy on 31 July.

The convoy was unsuccessfully attacked on 5 August by British aircraft.

At 00:23 on 21 November the covering cruiser force was detached from convoy C and returned to Naples. At 00:38 on 22 November Fairey Swordfish torpedo bombers from 830 Squadron attacked the covering force and torpedoed cruiser , blowing off her stern. The British continued their attacks but failed to cause any more damage. At 01:00 the ships of convoy C were escorted by destroyer  to Taranto to wait out any further air attacks. Turbine together with destroyers  and  then continued on to Reggio.

Some time on 14 December  and  collided, putting themselves out of action.

On 13 April 1942 Turbine and Freccia departed from Taranto for Tripoli escorting one of three supply convoys consisting of one merchant vessel, a part of "Operation Aprilia".

On 7 May British submarine  tried to intercept the convoy, but the attack was unsuccessful.

On 23 June the convoy was attacked by British aircraft damaging the Mario Roselli.

The convoy was attacked by British aircraft on several occasions and British submarines  and  but unsuccessfully.

The convoy carried 92 tanks, 340 automobiles, 3 locomotives, a crane, 292 soldiers, 4,381 tons of fuel and lubricants and 5,256 tons of other cargo. The ships reached their target destination without an incident despite heavy air attacks by Allied aircraft. On her return trip Turbine together with  escorted tanker  and cargo ship  from Tobruk to Greece. On 6 August British submarine  attacked and missed .

Turbine was then brought back to Italy for maintenance and re-armament. Her anti-aircraft defenses were strengthened with the removal of the remaining 40 mm/39 pom-pom anti-aircraft guns and installation of extra 20mm/65 Breda anti-aircraft cannons bringing their total number to 7 (two in twin and 3 in single mounts). At the same time 2 depth charge throwers were installed.

Following the defeat at El Alamein, and fall of Tripoli on 23 January 1943 and success of Operation Torch, Turbine was mostly involved in escort and anti-submarine operations in the Aegean for the remainder of the conflict.

In German service
At the time of Italy's signing of Armistice of Cassibile on 8 September 1943 Turbine was in Piraeus and was ordered by the Italian Command in Greece to surrender the vessel to the Germans. The order was obeyed and Turbine was transferred to Kriegsmarine on 9 September 1943, with most of the crew opting to leave the destroyer and being then sent to POW camps in Germany and Poland as "italian military internees". Turbine was renamed TA14 and became a part of 9. Torpedobootsflottille operating in the Aegean. The ship also received a significant anti-aircraft protection upgrade, as 3 torpedo tubes were removed and several 37mm and 20mm anti-aircraft cannons were added instead. TA14 was officially commissioned into Kriegsmarine on 28 October 1943 and was used as an escort throughout her German service.

Notes

Bibliography

External links
 Turbine (1927) Marina Militare website

Turbine-class destroyers
World War II destroyers of Italy
1927 ships
Ships built by Cantieri navali Odero
Maritime incidents in September 1944
World War II shipwrecks in the Mediterranean Sea

es:Turbine (TB)
it:Turbine (cacciatorpediniere 1927)
fi:RN Turbine (1927)